The VII Bolivarian Games (Spanish: Juegos Bolivarianos) were a multi-sport event held between February 17 - March 3, 1973, at the Estadio Revolución in Panama City, Panama.  The Games were organized by the Bolivarian Sports Organization (ODEBO). Ecuador was the only eligible country not to send a delegation because of "internal problems".

The Games were officially opened by Panamanian president Demetrio Basilio Lakas.  Torch lighter was long distance runner Faustino López, who won the gold medal in the 5000 metres event at the 1951 Bolivarian Games.  The athlete's oath was sworn by gymnast Xenia Moreno.

A detailed history of the early editions of the Bolivarian Games between 1938 and 1989 was published in a book written (in Spanish) by José Gamarra Zorrilla, former president of the Bolivian Olympic Committee, and first president (1976-1982) of ODESUR.

Participation 
About 1200 Athletes from 5 countries were reported to participate:

Sports 
The following 16 sports were explicitly mentioned:

Aquatic sports 
 Diving
 Swimming
 Water polo
 Athletics
 Baseball
 Basketball
 Bowling
 Boxing
Cycling 
 Road cycling
 Track cycling
 Fencing
 Football
 Gymnastics (artistic)
 Judo
 Shooting
 Softball
 Volleyball
 Weightlifting
 Wrestling

Medal count
The medal count for these Games is tabulated below.  A slightly different number of medals was published elsewhere.  This table is sorted by the number of gold medals earned by each country.  The number of silver medals is taken into consideration next, and then the number of bronze medals.

References 

Bolivarian Games
B
Bolivarian Games
B
Bolivarian Games, 1973
Bolivarian Games
Multi-sport events in Panama
20th century in Panama City
February 1973 sports events in North America
March 1973 sports events in North America
Sports competitions in Panama City